Shahbaz Garhi, or Shahbazgarhi, is a village and historic site located in Mardan District of Khyber Pakhtunkhwa, Pakistan. It is at an altitude of 293 metres (964 feet).

It is about 12 km from Mardan city. It has mountains, green trees, open fields and a small river in the centre of the village.

In old times all these facilities made it attractive for the army and travelers to dig in their tents here, stay for few days and organize their further strategy. The historic Stones of Ashoka (commonly known to the native people by the name of Hkule Gutt), and other sites like Mekha Sanda (male buffalo, female buffalo) are worth visiting.

Location
Shahbaz Garhi is situated on the junction of three ancient routes;

Kabul to Pushkalavati (modern Charsadda)
Swat through Buner
Taxila through Hund on the bank of Indus River.

Situated on the modern Mardan-Swabi Road, the town was once a thriving Buddhist city surrounded by monasteries and stupas.

Ancient rock edicts

Ashokan inscriptions

The town is the location of ancient rock-inscriptions that are cut into two large rock boulders and written in the Kharosthi script.  They retain immense historical importance, as they appear to be the first examples of writing in South Asia. They were constructed during the 3rd Century BC (272-231 BC), during the reign of Ashoka, the famous Mauryan emperor, inscribed in the Kharoshthi script.
The rock edicts were added to the UNESCO World Heritage Tentative List on 30 January 2004 in the Cultural category.

The translation of the text is written on a board nearby the rocks. The sight is a famous tourist spot for people who are interested in history.

The town is the location of ancient rock-inscriptions that are cut into two large rock boulders and written in the Kharosthi script.  They retain immense historical importance, as they appear to be the first examples of writing in South Asia. They were constructed during the 3rd Century BC, during the reign of Ashoka, the famous Mauryan emperor.
The rock edicts were added to the UNESCO World Heritage Tentative List on 30 January 2004 in the Cultural category.

References

External links

Map of Gandhara archeological sites, from the Huntington Collection, Ohio State University (large file)
Gandhari.org Complete text of the Shahbazgarhi edicts

Mardan District
Archaeological sites in Khyber Pakhtunkhwa
Former populated places in Pakistan
Edicts of Ashoka